Balad Ruz District  is a district of Diyala Governorate, Iraq. Cities and villages include Balad Ruz, Mandali, Turki Village, Fatamia, Kurkush, and Taweela. It is a district in Diyala Governorate, the vast majority of its residents are Sunni Arabs

References

Districts of Diyala Province